The Coalbrook mining disaster is the worst mining accident in the history of South Africa. The disaster occurred in the Coalbrook coal mine of Clydesdale Colliery on 21 January 1960 at around 19:00 when approximately 900 pillars caved in, almost  underground. About 1,000 miners were in the mine at the time and 437 died after being trapped, while the rest escaped through an incline shaft. The miners were suffocated by methane gas and crushed to death by rockfall. 

Miners felt a strong blast wind, many of whom rushed up to the surface but were instructed to return underground or face imprisonment. Only two miners refused to go back underground. The majority of the miners at Clydesdale Colliery were Lesotho and Mozambique nationals.

Immediately after the incident, rescue teams arrived from other mines in the region and boreholes were drilled into areas where survivors were expected to be. When microphones were lowered, no signs of life were detected. After 11 days the rescue was called off.

Causes of the disaster
The production at the mine had increased from 134,230 tons per year in 1954 to 2,260,660 tons per year by 1958, in response to the newly built Taaibos power station at Kragbron. 

The accident was caused by cascading pillar failure where a few pillars fail initially and this increases the load on the adjacent pillars causing them to fail. This cascading failure caused pillar collapse over an area covering 324 hectares.

Factors contributing to the collapse included the process of top coaling which raised the height of the tunnels and pillar and panel mining reducing the size of structures holding up the tunnel roof.

Top coaling
Top coaling began as a method of increasing production in areas that had already been mined. In 1932 the tunnels were 2.4 m high, in 1948 some top coaling was done to raise the height to 3.7 m, but the coal yielded was a poor grade and the practice stopped. In 1951 top coaling began once again as a new electricity power station had been built and it was able to use lower grade coal. The roof height was raised to 4.3 m and 5.5 m in places, and by 1957 top coaling was a significant contributor to production.

Some time between 1957 and 1959 experimental secondary mining was done in No.10 section to recover coal from a mined out area of the mine. Top coaling raised the roof height to between 4.3 and 6.1 m. On 28 December 1959 a collapse occurred in the northern part of the section 10 mine, an area where most of the top coaling experiments were done.

That collapse was stopped from spreading by a barrier wall to the south end of section 10. This incident did not affect coal extraction from the south. However, it did go unreported to mining inspectors.

It is reported that in the afternoon of 21 January 1960 miners who were operating in the western part of the section 10 mine heard loud noises that were trailed by a strong blast wind that was coming from the south east section.

Pillar and panel mining
The tunnels in the mine were between 6.1 and 6.7 metres wide. Pillars and panels of coal were left between the tunnels to keep the mine roof from collapsing.
In 1905 the centres of the barriers and the pillars were 24.4 m apart
From 1932 the pillars were mined to 19.8 m and barriers to 18.3 m.
From 1943 the pillars were reduced to 18.3 m and the barriers 12.2 m (still separated by tunnels 6.1 to 6.7 m in width)

In this time "dummies" of 4 metres wide and 2 metres deep were mined out of the barriers, and in some cases up to four sides of the pillars too, to yield additional coal.

Rescue efforts
With too much methane and carbon monoxide in the mine for any rescue team to penetrate the South East of section 10, one of the solutions was to drill from the surface all the way down into the entombed shaft. A sophisticated new drill rig at the time was used, but the drill bits wore down as they encountered hard lava rock.

Response
In the months following the disaster, four different inquiries were launched under the Mines and Works Act of 1956, with the third one being a judicial inquest. The inquests found that the deaths occurred as a result of the subsidence of the mine itself. They also revealed that the collapse of 28 December was not reported to mining inspectors, as was mandatory.

Following the disaster, the South African government established Coal Mines Research Controlling Council to improve coal mine safety and research pillar strength, supported by the Council for Scientific and Industrial Research and the Chamber of Mines Research Organization.

The South African Chamber of Mines obtained rescue equipment to reach men trapped underground in coal mines. Similar equipment was used to rescue trapped Chilean miners in 2010.

Compensation
With segregation being a policy of governance for the Apartheid regime, the Workmen Compensation Act entitled a white widow to her deceased husband’s pension fund, while a black widow was only granted a lump sum from the mining company.  Of the miners killed in the tragedy, half of them came from the then British High Commission Territory of Basutoland, while a little under half of the others came from Portuguese East Africa. Of the deceased, six were white South African men. 

The disaster sent shockwaves across the nation, which prompted the government to set up the National Mine Disaster Fund.

Commemorations

21 January 2020 will mark exactly 60 years since the disaster.

References

External link

Mining disasters in South Africa
Coal in South Africa
Mining in South Africa
1960 in South Africa 
1960 mining disasters
1960 disasters in South Africa